Anna Ebaju Adeke (born 27 November 1991) is a Ugandan lawyer and politician. Currently she serves as the  Member of Parliament representing Women in Soroti District in the 11th Parliament (2021–2026). She previously served as the parliamentary representative of the National Female Youth Constituency in the 10th parliament (2016–2021). She serves as  the Deputy President for Forum for Democratic Change in Eastern Region.

Background and education
Adeke attended Our Lady of Good Counsel Gayaza for her O' Level and later St Marys SS Kitende for her A' Level. She has a Bachelor of Laws degree from Makerere University and a Postgraduate Diploma in Legal Practice from Law Development Center. On 17 May 2021, Adeke graduated with a Master of Laws degree from Makerere University, on the same day she was sworn in as a member of Uganda's 11th Parliament (2021–2026).

Career
From 2013 until 2014, Adeke served as the Guild president of Makerere University,  she ran and won under the opposition Forum for Democratic Change political party. Since 2015, when she completed her legal studies, she was admitted to the Uganda Bar. She works as an Advocate at M&K Advocates, in Kampala.

In March 2016, Adeke was elected as the new National Female Youth Member of Parliament in national polls conducted in the Western Ugandan city of Hoima. In the national election, she ran as an independent. As an MP, she advocates for the separation of the Ministry of Gender, Labour, Youth and Social Development, to create an independent Youth Ministry. She also campaigns for increased funding for local, regional and national youth councils. She was a member of the parliamentary committee on the National Economy, in the 10th Parliament.

In 2019, Adeke was elected as chairperson Uganda parliamentary Forum on Youth Affairs. She also served as the shadow minister for youth and children affairs, and a member of the Uganda women parliamentary association (UWOPA), in the 10th Parliament (2016 - 2021).

Other activities
Adeke appeared in Vogue Italia in September 2017. In March 2017, The Ugandan Magazine listed her among the "10 Most Powerful Women In Ugandan Politics in 2017. She is a Roman Catholic. She is also passionate about gender and feminism issues and condemns sexual harassment, and urges women and the public to speak out against the evils of bullying sexual harassment and fight it. She also spoke out when a fellow parliamentarian tried to sexually harass her while on a foreign trip.

References

External links
Website of the Parliament of Uganda
Anne Adeke Wins National Female Youth MP Election

1991 births
Living people
Itesot people
Makerere University alumni
Law Development Centre alumni
Ugandan women lawyers
Members of the Parliament of Uganda
21st-century Ugandan women politicians
21st-century Ugandan politicians
Forum for Democratic Change politicians
21st-century Ugandan lawyers
21st-century Ugandan women
20th-century Ugandan women
People from Soroti District
People from Eastern Region, Uganda
Women members of the Parliament of Uganda
21st-century women lawyers